Mike Mutebi is a Ugandan professional football player and manager.

Career
He has coached KCC FC and the Uganda national football team.

In December 2011 he became  the head coach of the SC Villa.

References

External links

Year of birth missing (living people)
Living people
Ugandan footballers
Association football defenders
Ugandan football managers
Uganda national football team managers
Place of birth missing (living people)